Glais Stadium was a sports stadium and greyhound racing in Glais, near Swansea, Wales.

Before the greyhound stadium was constructed there was a recreation area and racecourse used for horse racing and pedestrianism. The stadium was built in 1928 and was situated on the northern edge of Glais near Glais Bridge. Greyhound racing was originally introduced in 1927 by the Welsh Racing and Athletic Association but was wound up in October 1928. It re-opened in late 1928 following the decision by the Swansea Corporation not to allow racing in the town centre at the St Helens ground. The stadium remained independent (unaffiliated with a governing body) and had a grandstand by 1935 but closed before World War II.

It reverted to being a recreation ground with a bowling green, tennis courts and sports fields. Today it is the Tawe Vale Golf and bowling club.

References

Defunct greyhound racing venues in the United Kingdom
Greyhound racing in Wales